Marino Faliero (1274 – 17 April 1355) was the 55th Doge of Venice, appointed on 11 September 1354.

He was sometimes referred to simply as Marin Falier (Venetian rather than standard Italian) or Falieri. He was executed for attempting a coup d'etat.

Early life

Faliero was the son of Iacopo Marin and Beriola Loredan. He had an uncle of the same name with whom he is often confused.

In 1315 Faliero was one of the three heads of the Council of Ten when it was punishing the organizers of the 1310 conspiracy by Bajamonte Tiepolo. Faliero continued as a member of the council until 1320 and held the office of chief and inquisitor several times. In 1320 he was charged with Andrea Michiel to organize the killing of Tiepolo and Pietro Querini, the only two leaders of the conspiracy still at large.

In 1323 Faliero was appointed captain and bailiff of Negroponte. In 1326 he was again in Venice as a member of the Council of Ten, but the following year he left for Bologna on a mission to the prior of the Servites who had a dispute with Venice. Back again in the Ten, he left shortly after to be elected one of the Five Elders to Peace, another group of Venetian magistrates. After a few years of absence from public life, he reappears again in 1330 as a member of the Council of Ten.

In 1333 he became captain of the galleys of the Major Sea and of Constantinople and protected the merchants going to Tanais in the Black Sea. In 1352 Faliero was sent on a diplomatic mission and met with the Bulgarian Tsar Ivan Alexander in Nicopolis, giving him a letter from the doge Andrea Dandolo.

Doge of Venice

Faliero was a naval and military commander and then a diplomat before being elected doge in succession to Andrea Dandolo. He learned of his election while he was on a diplomatic mission to the papal court at Avignon. The populace of Venice was at that time disenchanted with the ruling aristocrats who were blamed for a recent naval defeat by the fleet of the Republic of Genoa at the 1354 Battle of Portolungo during the Third Venetian–Genoese War.

Within months of being elected, Faliero attempted a coup d'etat in April 1355, aiming to take effective power from the ruling aristocrats. According to tradition, this came about because the dogaressa, Faliero's second wife, Aluycia Gradenigo, had been insulted by Michele Steno, a member of an aristocratic family, but in a study of doges of Venice Antonella Grignola suggests that Faliero's move was consistent with a prevailing trend in Italian cities to move away from oligarchic government to absolute, dynastic rule.

The plot intended to murder the chief patricians on 15 April and proclaim Faliero prince of Venice. It was badly organised, with poor communication between the conspirators, and was quickly discovered thanks to some of the conspirators having made revelations. The Council of Ten proceeded to arrest the ringleaders and to place armed guards all over the town. Several of the conspirators were condemned to death and others to various terms of imprisonment. Faliero pleaded guilty to all charges and was beheaded on 17 April and his body mutilated. Ten additional ringleaders were hanged on display from the Doge's Palace in Piazza San Marco.

Legacy 

Faliero was condemned to damnatio memoriae, and accordingly his portrait displayed in the Sala del Maggior Consiglio (Hall of the Great Council) in the Doge's Palace was removed and the space painted over with a black shroud, which can still be seen in the hall today. A Latin language inscription on the painted shroud reads: Hic est locus Marini Faletro decapitati pro criminibus ("This is the space reserved for Marino Faliero, beheaded for his crimes").

The story of Faliero's failed plot was later made into plays by Lord Byron (Marino Faliero, Doge of Venice in 1821) and Casimir Delavigne (in 1829). The latter's inspired by the former's version was adapted into an eponymous opera scored by Gaetano Donizetti in 1835.<ref name=grove>Ashbrook, William. "Marino Faliero", The New Grove Dictionary of Opera''', Oxford Music Online, accessed 17 June 2012 </ref> All three present the traditional story that Faliero was acting to defend his wife's honour. Prussian author E. T. A. Hoffmann used a different approach in his 1818 novella ; German composer Robert Schumann contemplated writing an opera based on Hoffmann's story.  Eugène Delacroix's 1826 painting The Execution of the Doge Marino Faliero is based on Lord Byron's play.

His home, Palazzo Falier, still exists in Venice, being one of the oldest structures there.

 Notes 

 Bibliography 
 

— (1893) "M. Faliero avanti ii Dogado," ibid.— (1897) "M. Faliero, la Congiura," ibid.''

1274 births
1355 deaths
14th-century Doges of Venice
14th-century executions
Damnatio memoriae
Executed heads of state
Executed Italian people
Medieval Italian diplomats
People executed by decapitation
People executed by the Republic of Venice
Republic of Venice military personnel
14th-century diplomats
Burials at Santi Giovanni e Paolo, Venice